Liolaemus boulengeri, also known commonly as Boulenger's tree iguana, is a species of lizard in the family  Liolaemidae. The species is endemic to Argentina.

Etymology
The specific name, boulengeri, is in honor of Belgian-born British herpetologist George Albert Boulenger.

Geographic range
L. boulengeri is found central Argentina in the provinces of Chubut, Mendoza, Neuquén, and Santa Cruz.

Habitat

Behavior
L. boulengeri is terrestrial.

Diet
L. boulengeri preys upon insects.

Reproduction
L. boulengeri is oviparous.

References

Further reading
Abdala CS (2007). "Phylogeny of the boulengeri group (Iguania: Liolaemidae: Liolaemus) based on morphological and molecular characters". Zootaxa 1538: 1–84.
Koslowsky J (1898). "Enumeración sistemática y distribución geográfica de los reptiles argentinos ". Revista del Museo de La Plata 8: 161–200 + Plates I–VIII. (Liolaemus boulengeri, new species, p. 176–177 + Plate III). (in Spanish).
Minoli I, Morando M, Avila LJ (2015). "Reptiles of Chubut province, Argentina: richness, diversity, conservation status and geographic distribution maps". ZooKeys 498: 103–126.
Schulte JA, Macey JR, Espinoza RE, Larson A (2000). "Phylogenetic relationships in the iguanid lizard genus Liolaemus: multiple origins of viviparous reproduction and evidence for recurring Andean vicariance and dispersal". Biological Journal of the Linnean Society 69 (1): 75–102.

boulengeri
Reptiles described in 1898
Reptiles of Argentina
Taxa named by Julio Germán Koslowsky